Pech Maho oppidum is located in the town of Sigean, Aude, France. The last season of excavations on the archaeological site since 2004 has identified most of the walls and the habitats of a pre-Roman oppidum, particularly highlighting the latter stages of occupation of this site before its definitive abandonment.

Pech Maho was a fortified trading post occupied from the sixth century BC to the third century BC. There are observed three successive occupations, apparently discontinuous, presumably by a people called Elisycs  (Ἐλισύκοι ων-Greek) installed at the limit of Iberians, Celts and Ligures. The site seems to be a commercial crossroads between Etruscans, Greeks, Carthaginians, and the indigenous people. The almost total destruction of the oppidum occurred at the end of the third century BC and may be linked with the Second Punic War who opposed Rome and Carthage. This war resulted in the control by Rome of eastern Iberian peninsula and western Languedoc. The catapult bullets found in the levels of destruction of the oppidum would be probative evidence. The excavations have also revealed traces of funerary rituals and animal sacrifices mixing cremation of human remains. These celebrations were probably held in honor of fallen heroes by the people who returned shortly after the destruction of the oppidum. Then the site would have received a few visits during the following decades before being completely forgotten. This period coincides with the establishment in the region of the Romans, who made Narbonne their prefecture since they will dominate Gallia Narbonensis.

Location 
The oppidum is actually located on a low altitude (29m) hill on the shore of the small coastal river Berre. When it was established it was located near the mouths of the Aude and Berre, the ford of the Heraclean Lane, which then allowed to join the Italy to Iberia. The oppidum was then directly on the shore of a sea-navigable and not a lagoon separated by dry land that currently observed. It stood on a hill, providing defence, and was linked to trade routes.

Location :

Discovery and excavations 
The site was discovered in 1913. Its name is contemporary, the ancient name is unknown. The excavations were conducted from 1948 to 1957 (J. Campardou) from 1959 to 1974 (Y. Solier) and again since 1998  (Gailledrat, Solier). The excavations are planned until 2010. In Sigean there is a museum that brings together collections from these excavations. The site is not freely accessible to the public. It can be visited with a guide, beginning at the museum on the last Saturday of the month, off season, on Wednesday morning in July and August and on demand.

Pech Maho has been listed since 1961 as a monument historique by the French Ministry of Culture. It was acquired by the State in 1968.

References

External links
 Sigean Museum which displays many artifacts from the site of Pech Maho, virtual tour. 
Report of planned excavations, Éric Gailledrat, Alexandre Beylier, Hugues Boisson Henri Duday, André Rivalan,  2006, PDF, 62p. 
Pech Maho,  Ttriennial Program 2008-2010, Interim Report 2008, Éric Gailledrat, CNRS, PDF, 142p.  
 Pech Maho in the sixth-fifth century av. AD. A place of exchange in elisyc territory , Eric Gailledrat, Pierre Rouillard, Revue archéologique de Narbonnaise no 35,  pp. 401–410, 2003. Suppléments ISSN 0153-9124. Association de la revue archéologique de Narbonnaise, Montpellier 
Rituals for the fallen heroes?, Press release, CNRS, 10 November 2009 copied in  Gallic rituals of the slain 

Populated places established in the 6th century BC
Populated places disestablished in the 3rd century BC
1913 archaeological discoveries
Oppida
Iron Age sites in France
Buildings and structures in Aude
Former populated places in France
Monuments historiques of Aude
Ruins in Occitania (administrative region)
Tourist attractions in Aude
Second Punic War